Chalil Baby better known as Chali Pala is an Indian actor who appears in Malayalam movies. He handles character roles and supporting roles in Malayalam films.

Biography
He is born at Thiruvananthapuram on 28 Sep 1957. He debuted in Iyer the Great in 1990.

Partial filmography

 Malayankunju (2022)
 12th Man (2022)
 Keshu Ee Veedinte Nadhan (2021)
 Prathi Poovankozhi (2019)
 Panchavarnathatha (2018)
 Ramaleela (2017)
 Sarvopari Palakkaran (2017)
 King Liar (2016)
 Amar Akbar Anthony (2015)
 Ring Master (2014)
 Pullipulikalum Aattinkuttiyum (2013)
 Proprietors: Kammath & Kammath (2013)
 Ladies and Gentleman (2013)
 Amen (2013)
 David and Goliath (2013)
 Njaan Anaswaran (2013)
 House Full (2013)
 Mumbai Police (2013)
 Nadodi Mannan (2013)
 Cobra (2012)
 Chapters (2012)
 Sthalam (2012)
 Sound Thoma (2012)
 Hero (2012)
 No. 66 Madura Bus (2012)
 Asuravithu (2012)
 Collector (2011)
 Film Star (2011)
 Kadhayile Naayika (2011)
 Vaidooryam (2012)
 Payyans  (2011)
 Mohabbath  (2011)
 Manushya Mrugam  (2011)
 Orma Mathram  (2011)
 Bhakthajanangalude Sradhaykku (2011)
 Pranchiyettan and the Saint (2010)
 Yugapurushan  (2010)
 Canvas  (2010)
 Annarakkannanum Thannalayathu  (2010)
 Pullimaan  (2010)
 Chekavar  (2010)
 Ividam Swargamaanu (2009)
 Kaanaakkanmani (2009)
 Black Dahlia (2009)
 Sambhu  (2009)
 Puthiya Mugham  (2009)
 Pramukhan  (2009)
 Malayali  (2009)
 2 Harihar Nagar  (2009)... Hotel Maneger 
 Robin Hood (2009)
 Gulumaal: The Escape  (2009)
 Orkkuka Vallappozhum (2009)
 Mulla (2008)
 Ayudham  (2008)
 Parthan Kanda Paralokam  (2008)
 Pachamarathanalil  (2008)
 Sound of Boot  (2008)
 Nasrani (2007)
 Black Cat (2007)
 Kichamani M.B.A. (2007)... Chakrapaani
 Baba Kalyani (2006)
 Jayam (2006)
 Raashtram (2006)
 Iruvattam Manavaatti (2005)
 Vellinakshathram (2004)
The King Maker Leader (2003)
 Bheri (2002)
 Pilots (2000)
 The Gang (2000)
 F I R (1999)
 Olympian Antony Adam (1999)
 Pathram (1999)
 Sooryavanam (1998)
 Meenakshikkalyaanam (1998)
 Lelam (1997)
 Nee Varuvolam (1997)
 Bhoothakkannadi (1997)
 Spadikam (1995)
 Iyer The Great (1990)

References

External links

Chali Pala at MSI

Male actors from Thiruvananthapuram
Male actors in Malayalam cinema
Indian male film actors
21st-century Indian male actors
20th-century Indian male actors
Year of birth missing (living people)
Living people